Oreophryne moluccensis is a species of frog in the family Microhylidae.
It is endemic to Indonesia.
Its natural habitats are subtropical or tropical moist lowland forests.

References

moluccensis
Amphibians of Indonesia
Taxonomy articles created by Polbot
Amphibians described in 1878
Taxa named by Wilhelm Peters